Giovanni Ferraris (? - ?) was an Italian paralympic table tennis player and wheelchair fencer who won thirteen medals, in three different sports and five different editions, at the Summer Paralympics.

See also
 Italian multiple medallists at the Summer Paralympics

References

External links
 

Date of birth missing
Date of death missing
Place of birth missing
Place of death missing
Paralympic table tennis players of Italy
Paralympic wheelchair fencers of Italy
Paralympic snooker players of Italy
Paralympic gold medalists for Italy
Paralympic silver medalists for Italy
Paralympic bronze medalists for Italy
Paralympic medalists in snooker
Paralympic medalists in table tennis
Paralympic medalists in wheelchair fencing
Table tennis players at the 1960 Summer Paralympics
Table tennis players at the 1964 Summer Paralympics
Table tennis players at the 1968 Summer Paralympics
Table tennis players at the 1972 Summer Paralympics
Table tennis players at the 1976 Summer Paralympics
Wheelchair fencers at the 1960 Summer Paralympics
Wheelchair fencers at the 1964 Summer Paralympics
Wheelchair fencers at the 1968 Summer Paralympics
Wheelchair fencers at the 1972 Summer Paralympics
Wheelchair fencers at the 1976 Summer Paralympics
Snooker players at the 1960 Summer Paralympics
Medalists at the 1960 Summer Paralympics
Medalists at the 1964 Summer Paralympics
Medalists at the 1968 Summer Paralympics
Medalists at the 1972 Summer Paralympics
Medalists at the 1976 Summer Paralympics
20th-century Italian people